Statistics of Lao League in the 2010 season.

Clubs 
Lao Army FC
Bank FC
City Copy Center FC 
Ezra FC
Lao-American College FC
Ministry of Public Security (MPS)
Ministry of Public Works and Transport FC
Vientiane FC

The season ran from 27 February to 11 April and all matches were played on Saturdays and Sundays at the Chao Anouvong Stadium in Vientiane. Bank of Laos were champions.

References

Lao Premier League seasons
1
Laos
Laos